Belém de São Francisco (Bethlehem of San Francisco) is a city  in the state of Pernambuco, Brazil. The population in 2020, according with IBGE was 20,730 and the area is 1830.81 km².

Geography

 State - Pernambuco
 Region - São Francisco Pernambucano
 Boundaries - Salgueiro   (N);  Bahia state  (S);  Itacuruba and Carnaubeira da Penha  (E);  Cabrobó  (W)
 Area - 1830.81 km²
 Elevation - 305 m
 Hydrography - Pajeú and Terra Nova rivers
 Vegetation - Caatinga hiperxerófila.
 Climate - Semi arid ( Sertão) hot and dry
 Annual average temperature - 26.2 c
 Distance to Recife - 456 km

Economy

The main economic activities in Belém de São Francisco are based in general commerce and agribusiness, especially farming of goats, sheep, cattle, donkeys and chickens;  and plantations of mangoes, onions,  and rice.

Economic Indicators

Economy by Sector
2006

Health Indicators

References

Municipalities in Pernambuco